The 1st RedeX Trophy was a Formula Two motor race held on 12 September 1953 at Snetterton Circuit, Norfolk. The race was run over 10 laps, and was won by British driver Eric Thompson in a Connaught Type A-Lea Francis, setting fastest lap in the process. Peter Whitehead in a Cooper T24-Alta was second and Les Leston in a Cooper T18-JAP was third.

Results

References 

Redex
Redex